La ragazzola is a 1965 Italian film directed by Giuseppe Orlandini.

Cast
Agnès Spaak as Lola
Giuliano Gemma as Raoul
Gabriella Giorgelli as Ines
Angelo Infanti as Alberto
Paola Borboni as Elvira
Margaret Lee as Adriana
Roberto De Simone as The Wizard
Sandro Dori as Fabrizio
Armando Carini
Anna Lina Alberti
Libero Grandi
Lamberto Antinori
Dony Baster

External links
 

1965 films
Italian drama films
1960s Italian-language films
1960s Italian films